Roca de la Feixa is a massive mountain of the Pyrenees, Catalonia, Spain. It has an elevation of 2,093 metres above sea level.

This mountain's summit rises above Durro village. It is located within the municipal limits of Vall de Boí, Alta Ribagorça.

References

Mountains of Catalonia
Alta Ribagorça